Transcension is a 2002 science fiction novel by Damien Broderick. It follows the story of lawyer Mohammed Kasim Abdel-Malik who after being killed his body is placed in cryonic suspension his mind is used as a source for an artificial intelligence, Aleph.

Background
Transcension was first published in the United States on 19 February 2002 by Tor Books in hardback format. In March 2003 it was republished in paperback format. Transcension won the 2002 Aurealis Award for best science fiction novel and was a short-list nominee for the 2003 Ditmar Award for best Australian novel but lost to Sean Williams' and Shane Dix's Echoes of Earth.

References

External links

2002 Australian novels
2002 science fiction novels
Aurealis Award-winning works
Tor Books books
Cryonics in fiction